The northern caiman lizard (Dracaena guianensis) is a species of lizard found in northern South America.

Appearance
The northern caiman lizard is built similarly to its cousin the tegu, with a large heavy set body and short but powerful limbs. Its head is bulky and often a red or orange color. Their jaws are heavily muscular to help aid in eating its normal prey of snails, crawfish and fresh water clams. It also has a few adaptations that help it in its watery habitat. It has a long and flattened tail, similar to its namesake, the caiman. The long tail helps the northern caiman lizard to successfully swim and dive. A clear third eyelid is thought to act like a pair of goggles underwater.

The body of the northern caiman lizard is very similar to that of a crocodile. It is typically a bright green with slight dark green banding. There are horned raised scales along the dorsal of the back. This helps to provide some protection against predators.

Distribution and habitat 
D. guianensis can be found in the south American countries of Brazil, Colombia, Ecuador, Peru, and the Guianas. It lives in swampy habitats and other wooded areas which are flooded. It is mostly aquatic and is an excellent climber. It spends most of its time basking on branches overhanging waterways such that it may be able to flee from predation by disappearing underwater.

The lizard's wild population number is unknown. There has yet to be a study on them in their natural habitat. Much of what we know about them comes from captive animals in zoos and aquariums, as well as in the homes of hobbyists.

This species was heavily hunted for their hides. In 1970 they were provided protection and the export of their skin dropped. Now local populations are safe where their habitat is protected. Captive farms have since been set up to provide animals for the leather trade. In recent years a number of these animals have found themselves in the pet trade.

Habits

The northern caiman lizard spends most of its time in or near water. At night, it hides in trees and bushes. Caiman lizards in the wild will take a variety of prey: snails, fish, amphibians, crabs, crawfish, clams, invertebrates and other freshwater inhabitants all can make up a caiman lizards diet. However they do specialize in snails. It takes the snail in the jaws, raises its head up so that the prey will slide into the back of the mouth, then crushes it with its back teeth. It then spits out the pieces of shell. The lizard has been known to even kill and eat Amazon river turtles by crushing the shell by the edges and eating the softer parts chunk after chunk. It will occasionally hunt rodents. It has also been known to burrow like its cousin the tegu.

In captivity
The northern caiman lizard has been hard to keep in captivity. Due to their natural diet consisting almost purely of snails, most wild caught adults will refuse to eat anything else. Some zoos and aquariums have had success in keeping and breeding them.

In the last five years, farmed baby northern caiman lizards from South America have made their way into the pet trade around the world. These hatchlings are more willing to accept other food sources. Even so, this is not a lizard which by any means is easy to keep or raise in captivity. They have strong jaws that are capable of delivering painful bites. Their aquatic lifestyle means they need a large pool or tank, but also need a place to dig and burrow and logs or other suitable material with dry surfaces to bask on. This can be quite hard to accommodate due to their need for high humidity and high basking surface temperatures. Proceeded by the fact that these lizards can grow to be fairly large, up to 4 feet in length, a large enclosure is mandatory to successfully keep them alive.

That being said, some owners claim there is a reward to keeping them. Northern caiman lizards are intelligent as can be seen in the way they approach a snail that is clinging to the rocks. They can solve problems which many other lizards apparently fail to and can generally recognize their owners, given they have been kept for the right amount of time and are in good health.

Captive diet includes turkey meat (often mixed with Mazuri alligator diet), mussels, clam meat, catfood, fish and some fruits.

A zoo in Basel Switzerland reported to have successfully bread Northern caiman lizards in early 2023.

References

Dracaena guianensis, Reptile Database

External links

Dracaena (lizard)
Lizards of South America
Reptiles of Brazil
Reptiles of Colombia
Reptiles of Ecuador
Reptiles of French Guiana
Reptiles of Guyana
Reptiles of Peru
Reptiles of Suriname
Reptiles described in 1802
Taxa named by François Marie Daudin